Yates is an unincorporated community in Randolph County, in the U.S. state of Missouri.

History
A variant name was "Yatesville". A post office called Yatesville was established in 1879, the name was changed to Yates in 1882, and the post office closed in 1954. The community has the name of George Yates, the original owner of the town site.  The Battle of Roan's Tan Yard occurred near the site of Yates.

References

Sources

Unincorporated communities in Randolph County, Missouri
Unincorporated communities in Missouri